Dianshanhu Avenue is a station on Line 17 of the Shanghai Metro. It opened with the rest of Line 17 on 30 December 2017.

History 
The station opened for passenger trial operation on 30 December 2017, concurrent with the opening of the rest of Line 17.

Description 

The station is located at the intersection of Huangnilou Road and Dianshanhu Avenue in the Qingpu District of Shanghai. An underground structure, the station contains two levels: a concourse level with four exits to street level, fare gates, and a customer service counter, and a platform level beneath the concourse level, with a single island platform and toilets. Like all stations on Line 17, Dianshanhu Avenue station is fully accessible. An elevator connects the street level to the concourse near Exit 3, while another connects the concourse to the platform within the fare-paid zone.

Dianshanhu Avenue station serves as the western terminus for some weekday rush-hour trains. During the weekday rush-hour period, two service patterns are operated along Line 17: one which serves all stops along the entire line, and another short-turn service which serves all stations between Dianshanhu Avenue and  only. At all other times, a single Line 17 service which makes all stops is operated.

Exits 
The station has four exits:
 Exit 1: Dianshanhu Avenue
 Exit 2: Dianshanhu Avenue
 Exit 3: Dianshanhu Avenue
 Exit 4: Dianshanhu Avenue, Huangnilou Road

References 

Railway stations in Shanghai
Shanghai Metro stations in Qingpu District
Railway stations in China opened in 2017
Line 17, Shanghai Metro